Fernando Cortez (born October 29, 1981) is a former Major League Baseball  infielder. His last MLB team was the Kansas City Royals.

Career

Tampa Bay Rays
Cortez was selected by the Tampa Bay Devil Rays in the 9th round of the 2001 Major League Baseball Draft. He began his professional career that year for the Hudson Valley Renegades. He received a promotion to the Charleston RiverDogs in 2002, where he would spend the season. In 2003, he played for the high-A Bakersfield Blaze and the AA Orlando Rays. In 2004, he remained in AA for the Montgomery Biscuits.

Kansas City Royals
On June 20, Cortez, along with outfielder Joey Gathright, was traded to Kansas City for left-handed pitcher J.P. Howell. Cortez was assigned to the roster of the Triple-A Omaha Royals and did not play in the majors with Kansas City in 2006. In , Cortez saw limited action with Kansas City, appearing in eight games. His 2007 campaign with the Royals resulted in a .286 batting average four hits in 14 at-bats, with one RBI and three runs scored. Kansas City designated him for assignment on July 11.

Chicago White Sox
Cortez signed with the Chicago White Sox for the  season and was assigned to the AAA Charlotte Knights. He played in 104 games in Charlotte, hitting .262/.296/.341 to go along with 93 hits. He became a free agent after the season.

Second Stint with Tampa Bay Rays
On April 20, 2009, Cortez signed a minor league contract with the Tampa Bay Rays and was assigned to the AA Montgomery Biscuits. He spent the entire year in Montgomery and elected free agency on November 9, 2009. On June 5, 2010, Cortez resigned with the Rays organization.

Second Stint with Chicago White Sox
On June 29, 2010, Cortez signed with the Chicago White Sox organization and was assigned to the Charlotte Knights. On November 6, 2010, Cortez elected free agency.

Somerset Patriots
Cortez signed with the Somerset Patriots of the Atlantic League of Professional Baseball for the 2011 season. Cortez played in 113 games for Somerset in 2011, carrying a .290/.341/.371 batting line and 125 hits. He became a free agent at seasons end.

External links

Kansas City Royals players
Tampa Bay Devil Rays players
1981 births
Living people
Major League Baseball infielders
Baseball players from California
Grossmont Griffins baseball players
American people of Puerto Rican descent
Hudson Valley Renegades players
Charleston RiverDogs players
Orlando Rays players
Bakersfield Blaze players
Montgomery Biscuits players
Durham Bulls players
Omaha Royals players
Charlotte Knights players
Newark Bears players
Birmingham Barons players
Somerset Patriots players